Udupi taluk is a taluk in the Udupi District of the Indian state of Karnataka. The headquarters is the town of Udupi.

According to the Indian Census of 2001, Udupi taluk has a population of 529,225 (251,021 males, 278,204 females) in 104,608 households, divided between an urban population of 152,646 and a rural population of 376,579. There are 99 villages identified as part of Udupi taluk.

Towns and villages
Udupi
Pangala

References

Taluks of Karnataka
Geography of Udupi district